Podporozhye ( and ) is the name of several inhabited localities in Russia.

Urban localities
Podporozhye, Leningrad Oblast, a town in Podporozhsky District of Leningrad Oblast; incorporated as Podporozhskoye Settlement Municipal Formation

Rural localities
Podporozhye, Republic of Karelia, a settlement in Pudozhsky District of the Republic of Karelia
Podporozhye, Krasnoyarsk Krai, a village in Mokrushinsky Selsoviet of Kazachinsky District of Krasnoyarsk Krai

Abolished localities
Podporozhye, Arkhangelsk Oblast, a former village in Onezhsky District of Arkhangelsk Oblast